= Yinas =

- Location within United Arab Emirates
- Coordinates: 25°44′29″N 56°7′49″E
- Country: United Arab Emirates
- Emirate: Ras Al Khaimah
- Elevation: 1,102 m (3,615 ft)

Yinas is the name of an abandoned mountainous settlement in Ras Al Khaimah, United Arab Emirates (UAE).
